George Sampson Gibbs (25 April 1908 – 25 May 1968) was an Australian politician.

He was born in Richmond to clerk George Thomas Pender Gibbs and Alberta Sampson. He attended Scotch College and became a schoolteacher, teaching at Malvern, Cann River, Boolarra South, Sunny Creek and Swan Marsh and serving as headmaster at Dennington and Koroit. In 1935 he married Rose Wilmott Jones, with whom he had three children. In 1955 he was elected to the Victorian Legislative Assembly as the Liberal and Country Party member for Portland. He was a backbencher and an opponent of capital punishment. He lost preselection in 1967 and stood unsuccessfully as an Independent Liberal. In 1968 he joined the Country Party, but he died at Warrnambool later that year.

References

1908 births
1968 deaths
Liberal Party of Australia members of the Parliament of Victoria
Independent members of the Parliament of Victoria
Members of the Victorian Legislative Assembly
20th-century Australian politicians
Politicians from Melbourne
People from Richmond, Victoria